White Corners is an unincorporated community, a completely rural agricultural hamlet roughly 2 miles east northeast of the Prairie du Chien city limits, Crawford County, Wisconsin, United States

Notes

Unincorporated communities in Crawford County, Wisconsin
Unincorporated communities in Wisconsin